Joseph & Lucinda Thawley House is a historic home located at Summitville, Madison County, Indiana.  It was built in 1894–1895, and is a -story, Queen Anne style frame dwelling.  It has a steep and complex hipped and gable roofline, a -story service wing, and rests on an ashlar limestone foundation.  The house features a wraparound porch.

It was listed in the National Register of Historic Places in 2009.

References

Houses on the National Register of Historic Places in Indiana
Queen Anne architecture in Indiana
Houses completed in 1895
Buildings and structures in Madison County, Indiana
National Register of Historic Places in Madison County, Indiana